Gökçeören, formerly Menye, is a town and municipality in Kula District, Manisa Province, Turkey.

References

Towns in Turkey
Populated places in Manisa Province